Robert Scheffer (6 May 1859, Vienna - 27 October 1934, Vienna) was an Austrian painter. He specialized in landscapes, genre scenes and portraits. He was also an art collector and operated a private art school.

Biography
He studied from 1879 to 1881 at the Academy of Fine Arts, Vienna, with Christian Griepenkerl, Carl Wurzinger and Leopold Carl Müller. By 1886, he had completed his studies at the Academy of Fine Arts, Karlsruhe, in the master classes of Ferdinand Keller.

From 1905 to 1918, he exhibited regularly at the Vienna Künstlerhaus. His most popular paintings were on the theme, "Young Woman in a Biedermeier Interior", of which there are numerous variations.  

He served as a board member of the Albrecht Dürer Association; from which he received the Silver Medal of the Albrecht Dürer Bunds in 1930.

After his death, the school was operated until 1949 by his daughter, Gret Kalous, under the name "Schule für künstlerisches Modezeichnen" (School for Artistic Fashion Drawing).

Sources
 
 Emmanuel Bénézit: Dictionnaire critique et documentaire des peintres, sculpteurs, dessinateurs et graveurs de tous les temps et de tous les pays. Vol. 9,  Gründ, Paris 1976, pg.355. 
 Joachim Busse: Internationales Handbuch aller Maler und Bildhauer des 19. Jahrhunderts. Wiesbaden 1977.
 Allgemeines Künstlerlexikon. Bio-bibliographischer Index A-Z. Saur, Munich 1999–2000, Vol. 8, pg.752.

External links

 More works by Scheffer @ ArtNet
 Robert Scheffer @ the Wien Geschichte Wiki
 Malschule Scheffer @ the Wien Geschichte Wiki

1859 births
1934 deaths
Austrian painters
Austrian genre painters
Austrian portrait painters
Artists from Vienna